Live Herald  is a part live, part studio album by British progressive rock musician Steve Hillage. The live tracks were recorded at several concerts in England between 1977 and 1978, and the studio tracks were recorded in 1979.

Track listing 
Track listing, recording dates and track times are taken from the liner notes of the original 1979 double album.

Side One
"Salmon Song" Hillage-Giraudy - 7:36
"The Dervish Riff" Hillage - 4:17
"Castle in the Clouds/Hurdy Gurdy Man" Hillage/Donovan - 7:02

all tracks recorded 26 March 1977 at the Rainbow Theatre, London

Side Two
"Light in the Sky" Hillage-Giraudy - 5:16 (recorded 25 May 1978 at Oxford Polytechnic)
"Searching for the Spark" Hillage-Giraudy - 11:11 (recorded 7 August 1978 at the Marquee Club, London)
"Electrick Gypsies" Hillage - 5:55 (recorded 3 November 1977 at the Rainbow Theatre, London)

Side 3
"Radiom/Lunar Musick Suite/Meditation of the Dragon" Hillage/Hillage-Giraudy/Hillage - 15:23 (recorded 26 March 1977 at the Rainbow Theatre, London)
"It's All Too Much/The Golden Vibe" Harrison/Hillage - 6:47 (recorded 25 May 1978 at Oxford Polytechnic)

Side 4
"Talking to the Sun" Hillage-Giraudy - 5:56
"1988 Aktivator" Hillage - 2:30
"New Age Synthesis (Unzipping the Zype)" Hillage-Giraudy-Anderson-McKenzie - 8:47
"Healing Feeling" Hillage-Giraudy - 6:09

all tracks recorded at Sawmills Studio, Powey, Cornwall

bonus tracks for 2007 CD release
"Solar Musick Suite" Hillage - 14:37

recorded in 1977 at the Rainbow Theatre, London

Musicians and production 
Musicians
 Steve Hillage − guitar, synthesiser, vocals (all tracks)
 Christian Boulé − glissando and rhythm guitar (side 1, tracks 1 to 3; side 2, tracks 1 and 2; side 3, tracks 1 and 2)
 Colin Bass - bass, vocals (side 1, tracks 1 to 3; side 3, track 1)
 Phil Hodge - keyboards (side 1, tracks 1 to 3; side 3, track 1)
 Miquette Giraudy − synthesiser, sequencer, bells (all tracks)
 Basil Brooks - synthesiser, sequencer, flute (side 1, tracks 1 to 3; side 3, track 1)
 Clive Bunker - drums (side 1, tracks 1 to 3; side 3, track 1)
 John McKenzie - bass, vocals (side 2, tracks 1 and 2; side 3, track 2, side 4, tracks 1 to 4)
 Curtis Robertson - bass (side 2, track 3)
 Andy Anderson − drums, percussion (side 2, tracks 1 and 2; side 3, track 2; side 4, tracks 1 to 4)
 Joe Blocker - drums, vocals (side 2, track 3)

Production
 Steve Hillage − producer (all tracks)
 Trevor White - engineer, Maison Rouge mobile studio, side 1, tracks 1 to 3; side 3, track 1
 Malcolm Heeley - engineer, Manor Mobile recording studio, side 2, track 1; side 3, track 2 
 Jeremy Allom - engineer, Manor Mobile recording studio, side 2, track 2
 Phil Newell - engineer, Manor Mobile recording studio, side 2, track 3
 Simon Fraser - engineer, side 4, tracks 1 to 4

Release information

References

External links
 

Steve Hillage albums
1979 albums
Virgin Records albums